Gregory Yong Sooi Ngean D.D., J.C.D. (Pha̍k-fa-sṳ: Yòng Sui-ngèn) (20 May 1925 – 28 June 2008) was the second, and the first local, Roman Catholic Archbishop of Singapore.

Biography

Early years 
Archbishop Yong was born into a Malaysian Chinese family of Hakka descent in Taiping, and received his education in St. George's Institution and St. Michael's Institution in Ipoh, Malaya. He was an exceptional boy, and liked to role-play as a priest and pretend to say mass in his games.

Priesthood 
In January 1941, he entered the Minor Seminary and in 1944 graduated to the Major Seminary. He was officially ordained in 1951 and posted to the Church of the Nativity of the Blessed Virgin Mary in Singapore. In 1953, he left for studies in Rome where he was conferred a Doctorate in Canon Law, the very first local priest to achieve the distinction. Back in Singapore in 1956, he was sent as assistant Parish Priest to the Church of the Sacred Heart. In the following year, he joined the teaching staff of the Minor Seminary. After a short stint as assistant Parish Priest at the Church of the Immaculate Heart of Mary, he was appointed to a teaching position in the Major Seminary, again, the very first local priest to be thus honoured. On 1 July 1968, he was consecrated Bishop, and took over the Diocese Of Penang from Bishop Francis Chan who had died on 27 October 1967.

Archbishop of Singapore 
On 3 February 1977, he was appointed to succeed Archbishop Michel Olçomendy as the first of the local clergy to lead the Church in Singapore. On 2 April 1977, he was officially installed as the Roman Catholic Archbishop of Singapore. He was the second Archbishop of the Archdiocese of Singapore, which was formed in 1972 when the Archdiocese of Malacca-Singapore split and held the office until retiring on 14 October 2000 and was succeeded by Archbishop Nicholas Chia.

It was also poor health that prompted his retirement, as he had a heart attack and had to be admitted to Mount Elizabeth Hospital for a heart bypass surgery in June that year. Archbishop Yong's last public media appearance was in May 2004, when Yong was summoned as a prosecution witness in the trial of Catholic priest Joachim Kang, who was convicted and jailed for misappropriation of S$5.1 million in church funds. In spite of his poor health, he made light of his ailment when the prosecutor asked if he needed a break. 'I'm okay and can carry on,' he replied, and then asked the judge if she was all right too, sparking laughter in the solemn courtroom.

He died on 28 June 2008 at St Joseph's Home, Singapore of a heart failure.

See also 
 Archdiocese of Singapore
 Cathedral of the Good Shepherd
Archbishop Nicholas Chia

References 
Eugene Wijeysingha (2006), Going Forth... - The Catholic Church in Singapore 1819-2004, Titular Roman Catholic Archbishop of Singapore,

External links 
Catholic-Hierarchy.org
Official Website of the Archdiocese of Singapore

Malaysian people of Chinese descent
1925 births
Singaporean people of Chinese descent
2008 deaths
Malaysian people of Hakka descent
20th-century Roman Catholic archbishops in Singapore
20th-century Roman Catholic bishops in Malaysia
Singaporean people of Hakka descent
Roman Catholic archbishops of Singapore
Singaporean Roman Catholic archbishops